This is a list of events that took place in Europe in 2017.

Events

January 
 January 1 – At least 39 people are killed in an attack on a nightclub in Istanbul.
 January 5 – A cold wave across Europe leaves at least 61 dead, including several migrants and homeless people.
 January 18 – 30 people are missing and feared dead after an avalanche buries a small hotel in the mountains of central Italy, following a series of earthquakes.
 January 20 – At least 16 people are killed and about 40 injured after a bus carrying Hungarian students crashes and bursts into flames on a highway in northern Italy.

February 
 February 2 – The European Parliament unanimously approves visa-free regime in the Schengen Area for Georgia.
 February 5 – In the largest protest since the 1989 Revolution, an estimated 600,000 people rally in main Romanian cities against a Government Ordinance decriminalizing some graft offenses.
 February 12 – Former foreign minister Frank-Walter Steinmeier is elected Germany's president.
 February 24 – Slovenia permits same-sex marriages for the first time under a law giving gay couples largely the same rights as heterosexuals though barring them from jointly adopting children.

March 
 March 2 – A methane gas explosion kills eight miners and injures six in western Ukraine.
 March 9 – Donald Tusk is re-elected as President of the European Council despite opposition from his home country, Poland.
 March 13 – János Áder is re-elected for a second five-year term as President of Hungary by the country's parliament during a secret vote.
 March 15 – Mark Rutte's centre-right VVD wins Dutch general election, positioning him for a third successive term as prime minister.
 March 22 – Three people die and at least 40 are injured after an attacker drives a car along a pavement in Westminster, stabs a policeman and is shot dead by police in the grounds of Parliament.

April 
 April 2 – Conservative Prime Minister Aleksandar Vučić wins Serbia's presidential election by a huge margin.
 April 3 – An explosion on a train carriage in Saint Petersburg's underground metro kills at least 14 people and injures dozens more.
 April 7 – Five people die and 14 are seriously injured after a hijacked truck ploughs into a shopping centre during a terrorist attack in Stockholm.
 April 16 – Turkish President Recep Tayyip Erdoğan and the country's prime minister declare victory in a referendum designed to hand Erdoğan sweeping powers. 
 April 28 – Ilir Meta is voted in as President of Albania amid an opposition boycott.
 April 29 – Turkey blocks access to Wikipedia, citing a law that allows the government to ban certain websites for the protection of the public.

May 
 May 7 – Emmanuel Macron wins French presidential election over rival Marine Le Pen.
 May 13 – Portugal's Salvador Sobral wins the grand final of the Eurovision Song Contest 2017 with his song "Amar pelos dois".
 May 22 – 22 people are killed and hundreds are injured when a suicide bomber attacks concertgoers at Manchester Arena.

June 
 June 3 
 Seven people are killed and 48 injured in a terrorist attack in London after assailants use a vehicle to plow into pedestrians on London Bridge and attack others with knives in nearby Borough Market.
 More than 1,500 people are injured after Juventus fans watching the Champions League final stampede in a Turin square after mistaking firecrackers for an explosion or gunshots.
 Malta's Prime Minister Joseph Muscat wins a second five-year term in office in early general elections.
 June 5 – Montenegro becomes the 29th member of NATO.
 June 8 – British Prime Minister Theresa May's Conservative wins the parliamentary elections but falls short of a majority.
 June 14 
 At least 79 people are dead or missing and presumed dead in London's Grenfell Tower fire.
 Leo Varadkar becomes Ireland's first openly gay Taoiseach.
 June 17 – A raging forest fire envelops a stretch of road in central Portugal, killing at least 61 people, including about 30 motorists who are trapped in their cars.
 June 18 – Emmanuel Macron's La République En Marche! wins absolute majority in French parliamentary elections.
 June 29 – Serbian parliament elects the new government of Prime Minister Ana Brnabić, the first woman and first openly gay person to hold the office.
 June 30 – German lawmakers vote by a wide margin to legalize same-sex marriage, a landmark decision which comes just days after Chancellor Angela Merkel drops her longstanding opposition to a free vote on the issue.

July

August 
 17 August - 2017 Barcelona attack

Deaths

January 
 1 January
 Tony Atkinson, Welsh economist (b. 1944)
 Derek Parfit, English philosopher (b. 1942)
 2 January
 John Berger, English art critic, novelist, painter and poet (b. 1926)
 Viktor Tsaryov, Russian footballer (b. 1931)
 3 January – Igor Volk, Ukrainian-born Russian cosmonaut and test pilot (b. 1937)
 4 January 
 Ezio Pascutti, Italian footballer (b. 1937)
 Georges Prêtre, French conductor (b. 1924)
 7 January – Mário Soares, 17th President and 105th Prime Minister of Portugal (b. 1924)
 8 January – Peter Sarstedt, English singer, instrumentalist and songwriter (b. 1941)
 9 January – Zygmunt Bauman, Polish sociologist and philosopher (b. 1925)
 10 January 
 Roman Herzog, President of Germany (b. 1934)
 Oliver Smithies, English-born American geneticist and physical biochemist (b. 1925)
 11 January – François Van der Elst, Belgian footballer (b. 1954)
 12 January
 Giulio Angioni, Italian writer and anthropologist (b. 1939)
 Graham Taylor, English footballer and manager (b. 1944)
 13 January
 Gilberto Agustoni, Swiss prelate of the Roman Catholic Church (b. 1922)
 Lord Snowdon, English photographer and filmmaker (b. 1930)

References 

 
2010s in Europe
Years of the 21st century in Europe